The Atherstone Hunt was a United Kingdom foxhound pack, with a hunting area of around  within Warwickshire, Leicestershire and Staffordshire.

History

The Atherstone was established in 1815 in Witherley, and known as the Atherstone hounds.  Between 1930 and 1950 the hunt was divided into North and South countries, but these were then reunited.

Country
The hunt country lies within Warwickshire, Leicestershire and Staffordshire, with major centres including Atherstone, Nuneaton, Coventry and Rugby. It adjoins the country of the Quorn.

Point-to-point
The hunt hosts its annual point-to-point event at Clifton-upon-Dunsmore, with proceeds going back to the hunt.

See also
List of fox hunts in the United Kingdom

References

Sport in Warwickshire
Sport in Leicestershire
Sport in Staffordshire
Fox hunts in the United Kingdom
Fox hunts in England
Atherstone